Zvonko Jazbec (born 7 September 1911 in Ohio, USA-died 15 March 1970 in Zagreb) was a Croatian football goalkeeper. He spent his career at HŠK Concordia Zagreb during the 1930s in the Yugoslav First League.

Club career
At age 4, he and his father moved to Croatia where Zvonko eventually established himself at one of the country's top clubs, HŠK Concordia.

International career
Initially trained as an athletic runner, he began to play football for the Yugoslav national team, making his debut in a March 1934 friendly match against Bulgaria and earning a total of 10 caps. Upon the foundation of the temporary Croatian team after German invasion of Yugoslavia, Jazbec played for his adopted background heritage in 3 international matches, including the very first match against Switzerland. He coincidentally enough also scored a goal during his tenure.

References

External links
 

1911 births
1970 deaths
Footballers from Zagreb
Sportspeople from Youngstown, Ohio
American emigrants to Austria-Hungary
Association football goalkeepers
Yugoslav footballers
Yugoslavia international footballers
Croatian footballers
Croatia international footballers
Dual internationalists (football)
HŠK Concordia players
Yugoslav First League players
Yugoslav football managers
NK Varaždin managers
HNK Rijeka managers
HNK Orijent managers